The cabinet of Nicolae Iorga was the government of Romania from 18 April 1931 to 5 June 1932.

Ministers
The ministers of the cabinet were as follows:

President of the Council of Ministers:
Nicolae Iorga (18 April 1931 – 5 June 1932)
Minister of the Interior: 
(interim) Nicolae Iorga (18 April – 7 May 1931)
(interim) Constantin Argetoianu (7 May 1931 – 5 June 1932)
Minister of Foreign Affairs: 
(interim) Constantin Argetoianu (18 – 27 April 1931)
Dimitrie I. Ghica (27 April 1931 – 5 June 1932)
Minister of Finance:
Constantin Argetoianu (18 April 1931 – 5 June 1932)
Minister of Justice:
Constantin Hamangiu (18 April 1931 – 7 January 1932)
(interim) Victor Vâlcovici (7 – 9 January 1932)
Valeriu Pop (9 January – 5 June 1932)
Minister of Public Instruction, Religious Affairs, and the Arts:
Nicolae Iorga (18 April 1931 – 5 June 1932)
Minister of the Army:
Gen. Constantin Ștefănescu-Amza (18 April 1931 – 5 June 1932)
Minister of Agriculture and Property:
Gheorghe Ionescu-Sisești (18 April 1931 – 5 June 1932)
Minister of Industry and Commerce:
Mihail Manoilescu (18 April – 14 June 1931)
Nicolae Vasilescu-Karpen (14 June 1931 – 12 January 1932)
Gheorghe Tașcă (12 January – 5 June 1932)
Minister of Public Works and Communications:
Victor Vâlcovici (18 April 1931 – 5 June 1932)
Minister of Labour, Health, and Social Security:
Ioan Cantacuzino (18 April 1931 – 5 June 1932)

Ministers of State:
Iuliu Hațieganu (29 April – 14 July 1931)
Valeriu Pop (14 July 1931 – 9 January 1932)
Vladimir Cristi (16 January – 5 June 1932)
Gen. Ioan Rășcanu (22 June 1931 – 5 June 1932)

References

Cabinets of Romania
Cabinets established in 1931
Cabinets disestablished in 1932
1931 establishments in Romania
1932 disestablishments in Romania